Magdalena Wasylik (born 31 August 1995 in Sieradz) is a Polish actress and singer.

She is known for her roles in Polish dubbing of Frozen, Oz the Great and Powerful and Despicable Me 2.

Polish dubbing

Movies 
 2002: Cadet Kelly
 2004: Pixel Perfect
 2007: Enchanted
 2009: Curious George: A Very Monkey Christmas
 2009: Lilly the Witch: The Dragon and the Magic Book – Mona
 2009: Princess Protection Program
 2009: The Dog Who Saved Christmas – Kara Bannister
 2010: The Dog Who Saved Christmas Vacation – Kara Bannister
 2011: The Dog Who Saved Halloween – Kara Bannister
 2012: ParaNorman – Agatha „Aggie” Prenderghast
 2012: Rise of the Guardians
 2012: Cat in the Hat Knows a Lot About Christmas – Fig the dolphin
 2012: A Fairly Odd Christmas
 2013: Oz the Great and Powerful – The girl on a wheelchair / China doll
 2013: Despicable Me 2 – Margo
 2013: Scooby-Doo! Stage Fright
 Chrissy
 2015: Strawberry Shortcake -Słodkie Winogrona
 2013: Frozen - Anna (singing)
 2014: Transformers: Age of Extinction – Tessa Yeager
 2014: My Little Pony: Equestria Girls – Rainbow Rocks - Adagio Dazzle
 2014: Santa Hunters - Elizabeth
 2019: Kraina lodu 2

Seriale 
 1992: Barney & Friends
 Sarah (episodes 142, 144, 150),
 Beth (episode 145)
 2000: Dora the Explorer – Dora
 2004-2014: LazyTown – Stephanie
 2004: Peppa Pig – Peppa Pig (TVP dubbing)
 2011: Kickin' It – Lindsay (episode 44)
 2011: Jessie – Ally Dawson (episode 33)
 2011: Austin & Ally – Ally Dawson
 2012: Care Bears: Welcome to Care-a-Lot
 Phoebe (episode 4)
 Kaja (episode 24)
 2012: Violetta – Natalia "Naty" Vidal

Video games 
 2011: The Witcher 2: Assassins of Kings

Songs 
 1999: SpongeBob SquarePants – opening song
 2010: Strawberry Shortcake's Berry Bitty Adventures – opening song (episodes 27-52)
 2014: Steven Universe - "Kochać jak Ty" (Love like you) –  ending song
 2013: Kraina lodu - "Ulepimy dziś bałwana" (Do You Want to Build a Snowman), "Pierwszy raz jak sięga pamięć" + reprise (For the First Time in Forever), "Miłość stanęła w drzwiach" ("Love Is an Open Door")
 2019: Kraina lodu 2 - "To niezmienne jest" (Some Things Never Change), "Już ty wiesz co" (The Next Right Thing)

Educational songs for children 
 2013: Piosenkowe zabawy dla dzieci Publishing house "Harmonia"
 2013: Bawię się, uczę i śpiewam Publishing house "Harmonia"
 2013: Piosenki o Bożym Narodzeniu i zimie Publishing house "Harmonia"
 2014: Śpiewasz ty i śpiewam ja! Publishing house "Harmonia"
 2014: Śpiew i zabawa z Marią Konopnicką Publishing house "Harmonia"

External links 
 Magdalena Wasylik in filmweb.pl

1995 births
Living people
21st-century Polish singers
21st-century Polish women singers